Oedaspis daphnea is a species of tephritid or fruit flies in the genus Oedaspis of the family Tephritidae.

Distribution
Morocco.

References

Tephritinae
Insects described in 1930
Diptera of Africa